Leavin' Trunk/She Said, She Said is a limited edition vinyl single by The Black Keys. It was released on the independent label, Isota Records - only 1,000 hand-numbered copies were produced. The two songs were pressed onto a clear vinyl record, and the hand-printed slip cover included a photograph of a child with birds. The artwork was designed by Nat Russell.

Track listing
 "Leavin' Trunk" (traditional) - 2:55
 "She Said, She Said" (Lennon–McCartney) - 2:29

Personnel
Dan Auerbach: guitar, vocals
Patrick Carney: drums

References

External links
The Black Keys website
Isota Records

The Black Keys albums
2003 EPs
The Black Keys songs
Covers EPs
2003 debut singles
2003 songs